Maharani Lakshmi Ammanni College For Women, is a women's general degree college located at Malleshwaram, Bangalore, Karnatka. It is established in the year 1972. For the academic year 2019–2020, it was affiliated with Bengaluru City University. The college offers various undergraduate and postgraduate courses in arts, science and commerce.

Departments

Science

Physics
Chemistry
Mathematics
Botany
Zoology
Microbiology
Biotechnology
Biochemistry
Computer Science
Psychology

Arts and Commerce

Kannada
English
Hindi
History
Political Science
Sociology
Economics
Business Administration   
Commerce

Accreditation
The college is  recognized by the University Grants Commission (UGC).

References

External links
 

Educational institutions established in 1972
1971 establishments in Mysore State
Colleges affiliated to Bangalore University
Colleges in Bangalore